The Chief of Defence Force is the professional head of the Somali Armed Forces. He is responsible for the administration and the operational control of all branches of the Somali military (Army, Navy and Air Force) and thus is the direct superior to both the Chief of the Navy and the Chief of the Air Force. The post has however only been held by Army officers and the term limit is 2 years, typically the rank held by the Chiefs is the second highest rank and the highest available rank in peacetime in the Somali Armed Forces, that of major general (although there are chiefs that have held the rank of brigadier general.)

List of Chiefs

Somali Republic and Somali Democratic Republic (1960–1991)

Transitional Federal Republic (2004–2012)

Federal Republic (2012–present)

References

Somalian military leaders
Chiefs of defence